The 1969–70 European Cup was the fifth edition of the European Cup, IIHF's premier European club ice hockey tournament. The season started on September 13, 1969 and finished on October 10, 1970.

The tournament was won by CSKA Moscow, who beat Spartak Moscow in the final

First round

 SG Dynamo Weißwasser, 
 Dukla Jihlava   :  bye

Second round

Third round

 Spartak Moscow,   
 CSKA Moscow  :  bye

Semifinals

Finals

References 
 Season 1970

1
IIHF European Cup